Sprague Fountain, also known as the Capitol Fountain, is an outdoor bronze fountain and sculpture installed in the Capitol Mall area on the Oregon State Capitol grounds in Salem, Oregon, United States. The fountain was donated by Governor Charles A. Sprague to commemorate water and dedicated in 1980.

See also

 1980 in art

References

External links
 a

1980 establishments in Oregon
1980 sculptures
Bronze sculptures in Oregon
Fountains in Salem, Oregon
Monuments and memorials in Salem, Oregon
Outdoor sculptures in Salem, Oregon